Song Bo may refer to:

Song Bo (footballer)
Song Bo (skier)